Laccophilus parvulus, is a species of predaceous diving beetle found in South and South East Asia.

Subspecies
Two subspecies have been identified. Typical body length is about 3.4 mm.

 Laccophilus parvulus obtusus Sharp, 1882 - India, Bangladesh, Nepal, Cambodia, China, Indonesia, Laos, Singapore, Thailand, Vietnam
 Laccophilus parvulus parvulus Aubé, 1838 - India, Bangladesh, Bhutan, Myanmar, Nepal, Pakistan, Sri Lanka; China, Indonesia, Malaysia, Philippines, Singapore, Thailand, Vietnam

Biology
The fungus Chitonomyces bakeri has been identified as a parasitic ascomycote from adult beetles. Adults are voracious predators on mosquito larva of Culex species.

References 

Dytiscidae
Insects of Sri Lanka
Insects described in 1890